The VCU Greek Row is a strip of fraternity and sorority houses that are situated along Cary Street in the West End of Richmond, Virginia. It is located along the border of Randolph and The Fan.

See also 
 Virginia Commonwealth University
 Neighborhoods of Richmond, Virginia

References

External links 

VCU Greek Row

Neighborhoods in Richmond, Virginia